Mike Vining (born October 26, 1944) is an American  retired college basketball coach. He was head men's basketball coach at the University of Louisiana at Monroe from 1981 to 2005.  During his time at Louisiana–Monroe, he led the team to seven NCAA Division I men's basketball tournament appearances.

References

1944 births
Living people
American men's basketball coaches
Louisiana–Monroe Warhawks men's basketball coaches